Gary Bruce Sabourin (born December 4, 1943) is a Canadian former professional ice hockey right winger who played ten seasons in the National Hockey League from 1967–68 until 1976–77.

Career
Sabourin played in the NHL All-Star Game in 1970 and 1971. He played 627 career NHL games, the first 7 seasons with the St. Louis Blues, scoring 169 goals and 188 assists for 357 points. Sabourin also played 62 playoff games, scoring 19 goals and 11 assists for 30 points. 
He owned Buns Master Bakery in Chatham, Ontario until it was lost to a fire that engulfed the entire block on March 10, 2011.

Career statistics

Regular season and playoffs

External links

1943 births
Living people
California Golden Seals players
Canadian ice hockey forwards
Cleveland Barons (NHL) players
Franco-Ontarian people
Guelph Royals players
Ice hockey people from Ontario
Kitchener Rangers players
Minnesota Rangers players
Sportspeople from Parry Sound, Ontario
St. Paul Rangers players
St. Louis Blues players
Toronto Maple Leafs players